Ann-Marie "Mia" Elizabeth Karlsson (born 21 March 1968) is a former Swedish cross-country skier. She competed at the 1992 Winter Olympics representing Sweden. She is the mother of cross-country skier Frida Karlsson.

Cross-country skiing results
All results are sourced from the International Ski Federation (FIS).

Olympic Games

World Championships

World Cup

Season standings

References

External links 
Ann-Marie Karlsson at Olympic.org

1968 births
Living people
People from Jönköping
Swedish female cross-country skiers
Cross-country skiers at the 1992 Winter Olympics
Olympic cross-country skiers of Sweden
Sportspeople from Jönköping County
20th-century Swedish women